Brett Howland (born 13 June 1976 in Sydney, New South Wales) is an Australian former professional rugby league footballer who played in the 1990s and 2000s. He played for the Penrith Panthers in the National Rugby League competition. He previously played for the Cronulla-Sutherland Sharks but was forced out due to the salary cap.

Playing career
Nicknamed “The Whippet” due to his long, wiry frame, Howland was a Cronulla junior and made his first-grade debut for Cronulla-Sutherland in the 1997 Super League competition. In 1999, Howland enjoyed his best season as a player, scoring 18 tries in 26 games. The season was also the best on record for Cronulla at the time, as they won the minor premiership for the first time since 1988, and were favorites to win their first premiership since being admitted into the premiership in 1967. Cronulla backed up this claim by defeating the Brisbane Broncos 42–20 in the qualifying final. In the preliminary final against the St. George Illawarra Dragons, Cronulla led at half-time, but ended up losing the match 24–8 with Howland playing on the wing.

In 2000, Cronulla finished eighth on the table and were eliminated in the first week of the finals by Brisbane, with Howland again playing on the wing.  

In 2001, Howland joined the Bulldogs and played 12 games for the club in his first season. In 2002, Howland didn't feature in any first-grade games for the Bulldogs, but did play in the premiership-winning reserve-grade team.

In 2003, Howland joined the Penrith Panthers but was not included in the 2003 premiership-winning line-up. As 2003 NRL premiers, Penrith traveled to England to face Super League VIII champions, the Bradford Bulls in the 2004 World Club Challenge. Howland played on the wing in Penrith's 22–4 loss. Howland played two further seasons for Penrith and retired at the end of the 2005 season.

Career highlights 
Junior Club: Gymea Gorillas
Career Stats: 110 career game, scoring 49 tries

References

External links 
Bulldogs profile
NRL profile

1976 births
Living people
Australian rugby league players
Canterbury-Bankstown Bulldogs players
Cronulla-Sutherland Sharks players
Penrith Panthers players
Rugby league wingers
Rugby league players from Sydney